IT-Branchen is a discontinued IT sales magazine and website published by IDC. It was first published on 17 May 1999 with a monthly circulation of 9,000 includes traditional distributors, dealers, marketing managers, product sales personnel, and Internet e-commerce developers and strategists. The magazine folded in 2002 when it was acquired by n-com, which also published Computer Reseller News.

References

External links
 Official website

1999 establishments in Denmark
2002 disestablishments in Denmark
Danish-language magazines
Defunct computer magazines
Defunct magazines published in Denmark
Magazines established in 1999
Magazines disestablished in 2002